Jurie Sadler (born 17 August 1973) is a South African cricket umpire. He has stood in matches in the 2016–17 Sunfoil 3-Day Cup and the 2016–17 CSA Provincial One-Day Challenge tournaments.

References

External links
 

1973 births
Living people
South African cricket umpires